Sphenomorphus mimicus, the dwarf forest skink, is a species of skink. It is found in Thailand and Vietnam.

References

mimicus
Reptiles described in 1962
Taxa named by Edward Harrison Taylor
Reptiles of Thailand
Reptiles of Vietnam